A million is 1,000,000.

Millions or Million may refer to:

Films
 Millions (1936 film), a British comedy film
 Millions (1991 film), an English-language Italian drama
 Millions (2004 film), a British comedy-drama
 A Million, a 2009 South Korean thriller

Music

Performers
 Millions (band), an American noise rock band formed in 2006
 The Millions (band), an American alternative rock band, active 1989–1995 and from 2012
 Russ Millions, stage name of British rapper Shylo Milwood (born 1996) 
 Million Stylez, stage name of Swedish dancehall artist Kenshin Iryo (born 1981)

Songs
 "Millions" (Pusha T song), by Pusha T
 "Millions", a song by STRFKR from the 2011 album Reptilians
 "Millions", a song by Gerard Way from the 2014 album Hesitant Alien
 "Millions" (Winner song), a song by South Korean band Winner
 "Millions", a song by KSI from the 2020 album Dissimulation

People
 Million Manhoef (born 2002), Dutch footballer
 Ten Million (1889–1964), minor league baseball player

Other uses
 Millions (novel), British children's book based on the 2004 movie
 The Travels of Marco Polo or The Million, a transcription by Rustichello da Pisa of Marco Polo's travels between 1271 and 1298
 Million, Kentucky, a community in the United States
 Arlington Million, an American Thoroughbred horse race
 Million Lottery or Million Adventure, the first English state lottery, launched in 1694
 Million Air, a privately held aviation company

See also

one million (disambiguation)

Lists of ambiguous numbers